Colwyn Bay railway station is on the Crewe to Holyhead North Wales Coast Line serving the seaside town of Colwyn Bay in North Wales.

History

Colwyn Bay station was opened by the Chester and Holyhead Railway in October 1849; originally named Colwyn, it was renamed Colwyn Bay in 1876.
The station is in an unusual location straddling a curved section of track. As a result, the track bed is cambered so that trains come to rest at the station platform at a significant tilt. In recent years enforcement action was taken by the Environment Agency when fuel oil spilled from the over-filled tanks of a diesel engine and percolated through the track bed and flowed onto the nearby beach, polluting it.

The current station consists of the platform faces that served the former fast lines (the section from here to Llandudno Junction was quadruple track until the 1960s). The platform faces to the slow lines were taken out of service and that on the "down" (westbound) side has been obliterated as a result of the construction of the A55 dual carriageway (along with the old station goods yard). The main station building stands on what was the down island platform.

Facilities
Ticket barriers are in operation at this station, as are special blue lights in the toilets to stop people abusing intravenous drugs. The station has a footbridge and sheltered seating, along with digital information screens and automatic train announcements on both platforms.  Lifts provide full step-free access to each side.  The ticket office is staffed all week, from 06:15 until 19:15 on weekdays and from 11:15 to 18:15 on Sundays.

Services

Mondays to Saturdays:

 Transport for Wales Rail operates an alternate hourly service between Holyhead and Birmingham International or Cardiff Central via Wrexham General. A few early morning/late evening trains start/finish at  rather than Birmingham or Cardiff.
 Transport for Wales Rail also operates an hourly stopping service between Llandudno and Manchester Piccadilly via .
 Avanti West Coast operates four trains per day each way from London Euston to Holyhead, as well as an additional northbound only service from London Euston to Bangor. There are two services each way per weekday from Crewe to Holyhead, with two extra northbound services, of which one terminates at Bangor. One northbound service originates from Birmingham New Street. There are three southbound services per day to London Euston on Saturdays, as well as one southbound service per day each way to Crewe, with two northbound trains to Holyhead from London Euston and two trains to Holyhead from Crewe. There is also a northbound only service from Crewe to Llandudno Junction.

On Sundays there is a basic hourly service each way, westbound to Holyhead and eastbound to Crewe. There are three services each way to London Euston, as well as a northbound only service from Crewe to Holyhead. A limited number of trains to Birmingham, Cardiff and Manchester also operate.

References

Further reading

External links

Railway stations in Conwy County Borough
DfT Category D stations
Former London and North Western Railway stations
Railway stations in Great Britain opened in 1849
Railway stations served by Transport for Wales Rail
Railway stations served by Avanti West Coast
Colwyn Bay
1849 establishments in Wales